Rhythm & Noise were an American Experimental music and multimedia ensemble from San Francisco, California. The group originally consisted of Naut Humon, Nik Fault, and Rex Probe, who started the project in the mid-70s under the name Cellar-M. In 1984, The Residents convinced the band to join their label Ralph Records, under which the group released two albums and an extended music video. Naut Humon decided against releasing anymore records under the name Rhythm & Noise and began focusing on his work with Sound Traffic Control.

Discography 
Studio albums
Contents Under Notice (1984, Ralph)
Chasms Accord (1985, Ralph)

VHSs
Shadowkrack (1984, Ralph)

References 

American experimental musical groups
American experimental rock groups
Musical groups established in 1976
Musical groups from San Francisco
Noise musical groups